Jeanne Pérez (28 September 1894 – 11 May 1975) was a French film actress. She appeared in 50 films between 1930 and 1975.

Filmography

References

External links

1894 births
1975 deaths
French film actresses
People from Castelsarrasin
20th-century French actresses